Theodore Barrow is an American art historian, writer, professor, skateboarding critic, social media persona, lecturer, and skateboarder.

Creative practice

Feedback TS 
Barrow ran a satirical Instagram account about skateboarding and culture, @feedback_ts. Barrow built his following critiquing submitted video clips from skaters skating in skate parks. Feedback TS was no longer accepting clips but has returned to his critiques, also posting on his stories about works of art. @feedback_ts was terminated by Instagram in late 2020.

Writing 
In addition to posting his writing and thoughts on instagram via the Feedback TS account, Barrow writes about a range of topics including skateboarding history, art history, and the relationship between the two. Barrow often uses the stories feature in Instagram to reach his audience. Barrow has contributed writing to a variety of publications including The New York Times, Jenkem, Skateism, Transworld Skateboarding, Smithsonian Associates, Bucknell University Press, and the Boscobel House. 

In 2019, Barrow release a zine, tilted "Man Proposes God Disposes," and a guest deck both with StrangeLove skateboards.

On skateparks 
One avenue of Barrow's critical discourse analyzes the changing use of skateparks, highlighting a generational shift between skateboarders raised on the pre-built terrain of skateparks and those raised before the proliferation of skateparks. Barrow explains that "skateparks have always been designed to contain an activity that is about roaming, and often dangerous, or at least unlawful trespassing... As skateparks themselves have proliferated, they have become more central to that idea of performance, both fashionable and athletic”

Public speaking 
In 2019, the Brooklyn Patch reached out to Barrow for his opinions on the Tompkins Square Park turfing controversy. Also in 2019, Barrow spoke at the Pushing Boarder conference in Malmö during the Tech Will Save Us panel. Additionally, Barrow moderated a panel titled: What We Do is Secret: The Challenge of Writing about Skateboarding, at the 2018 Pushing Boarders conference held in London.

Teaching career 
Barrow has taught at Baruch, City College, the College of Staten Island, Brooklyn College, Cooper Union, and Barnard Pre-College.

References

External links 
 SHARK TALE: Resurfacing Winslow Homer’s most elusive painting by Ted Barrow - July 2022 - Artforum 
 Brutally Honest Reviews Of Your Best Instagram Clips With Ted Barrow (Episode 1)

American skateboarders
Living people
Year of birth missing (living people)
Brooklyn College faculty